The 2011 New Zealand Music Awards was the 46th holding of the annual ceremony featuring awards for musical artists based in or originating from New Zealand. Finalists for the three technical awards were announced on August 2011 with winners announced on 7 September, the date on which finalists for 16 'non-technical' categories were revealed. Five 'non-technical' awards were presented without a group of finalists being selected. The awards ceremony took place on 3 November 2011 at Vector Arena, Auckland – this was later in the year than previous ceremonies, due to the 2011 Rugby World Cup being held in New Zealand in September and October. The ceremony was hosted by television presenter Shannon Ryan and comedian Ben Boyce and broadcast live on television channel Four.

The Naked and Famous won the most awards, with seven, including Album of the Year, Single of the Year and two technical awards. The band's nine nominations made it the most-nominated artist. Brooke Fraser won five awards, including Highest selling New Zealand Single and Highest selling New Zealand Album. Kimbra was awarded the Critics' Choice Prize, while Dragon won the Legacy Award, and so was inducted into the New Zealand Music Hall of Fame. The Naked and Famous, Ladi6, Fraser, Six60, Avalanche City, Tiki Taane and Supergroove all performed at the awards ceremony.

Nominees and winners
Winners are listed first and highlighted in boldface.
Key
 – Non-technical award
 – Technical award

Presenters and performers

Performers
Performers at the ceremony:
The Naked and Famous – "Young Blood"
Ladi6 – "Bang Bang"
Brooke Fraser – "Something in the Water"
Six60 – "Rise Up"
Avalanche City – "Love Love Love"
Tiki Taane – "Freedom to Sing"
Supergroove – "Rain" (Dragon tribute)

References

External links
Official New Zealand Music Awards website

New Zealand Music Awards, 2011
Music Awards, 2011
Aotearoa Music Awards
November 2011 events in New Zealand